FishingBooker is an online marketplace specializing in booking charter boats for recreational fishing. The company was founded in Belgrade, Serbia, by CEO Vukan Simic, and is headquartered in Norfolk, Virginia.

The company has been described as an online travel agency for fishing charters, “the world’s largest online community” and marketplace for connecting fishers and charters around the world,
and “Airbnb for fishing charters”. It is cited among Serbia’s most successful tech startups.

FishingBooker publishes an annual list of the best places in the United States for fishing, and has boat listings in over 1,000 cities across more than 100 countries.

History 
FishingBooker was founded in 2013 by Vukan Simic in Belgrade, Serbia, after he had recently graduated from the University of Belgrade. The pair created the company to streamline boat chartering.

In 2014, Simic invested US $60,000 into the company in two rounds. He is the company's sole investor.

In 2016, FishingBooker expanded and moved its headquarters to Norfolk, Virginia.

Services 
FishingBooker allows for comparison of charters which do not have any shared practices or independent ability to book online. It is similar to other services that broker boat rentals, but the site is specialized for finding, comparing and booking fishing charters, including fishing gear and the services of a captain, as well as the boat itself.

Awards and criticism
In 2014, FishingBooker won the Audience Choice award at TechCrunch Disrupt SF. However, some technical writers criticized the company's site. While supporters focused on the large potential market, critics focused on the site's limited technical innovation.

References

External links
 

Recreational fishing
Serbian companies established in 2013
Online companies of Serbia
Companies based in Belgrade
Entertainment companies established in 2013